Forever and Ever (Chinese: 一生一世) is a 2021 contemporary Chinese romantic television series, starring Ren Jialun and Bai Lu. The series is based on the novel Yi Sheng Yi Shi Mei Ren Gu (一生一世美人骨) by Mo Bao Fei Bao. It's available on iQiyi and iQ.com from September 6, 2021. The series is part of iQIYI's Sweet On Theater (恋恋剧场), an iQIYI original lineup of romantic television series.  The series is a themed companion to One and Only, and both shows were released back to back.  Both series were adapted from the same novel and features the same characters in different eras.  The drama was a commercial success and one of iQIYI's most popular show of 2021.

Cast

Main 

 Ren Jialun as Zhousheng Chen (a chemistry professor)
 Bai Lu as Shi Yi (a voice actor)

Supporting 

 Ci Sha as Mei Xing
 Wang Yueyi as Hong Xiaoyu
 Luo Mingjie as Zhou Wenchuan
 Wang Ruixin as Zhou Wenxing
 Luo Haiqiong as Qin Wan
 Feng Jiayi as Zhou Sheng Xing

Production 
The series began filming in September 2020, and wrapped up in November 2020.

References

External links 

 Forever And Ever on Sina Weibo
 Forever And Ever on Douban
  on Forever and Ever] on IMDb

2021 Chinese television series debuts
IQIYI original programming